Melvin Holmes (January 22, 1950 – December 24, 2015) was an American football player with the Pittsburgh Steelers from 1971 to 1973. He is the father of Detroit Lions general manager Brad Holmes.

Early life
Holmes was born in Miami, Florida. He played high school football at Mays High School in Miami, and college football at North Carolina A&T State University.

Career
He was drafted in 1971 by the Pittsburgh Steelers. Recently he also lectured at Upward Bound program.

References

Pittsburgh Steelers players
1950 births
2015 deaths
American football offensive linemen
North Carolina A&T Aggies football players
Players of American football from Miami